Lucía María Rodríguez Herrero (born 24 May 1999) is a Spanish professional footballer who plays as a right back for Liga F club Real Madrid CF and the Spain women's national team.

Club career
Rodríguez started her career with Madrid CFF.

References

External links
 Profile at Real Madrid

 

1999 births
Living people
Women's association football defenders
Spanish women's footballers
Footballers from Madrid
Madrid CFF players
Real Sociedad (women) players
Real Madrid Femenino players
Primera División (women) players
Spain women's youth international footballers